Charles Abbott Miner (August 30, 1830 – July 25, 1903) was an American industrialist and politician. He was affiliated with the Republican Party and served three terms (1875–1880) in the Pennsylvania House of Representatives as a state legislator from Wilkes-Barre.

References

1830 births
1903 deaths
19th-century American politicians
American industrialists
Members of the Pennsylvania House of Representatives
19th-century American businesspeople
Businesspeople from Pennsylvania
Politicians from Wilkes-Barre, Pennsylvania